Walton is a village in Powys, Wales,  west from the border with Herefordshire, England.

A minor road connects to Old Radnor.

Villages in Powys